Arrowhead Springs is a highly mountainous neighborhood in the  municipality of San Bernardino, California, officially annexed to the city on November 19, 2009. The neighborhood lies below the Arrowhead geological monument, which is California Historical Landmark #977.

The natural geologic formation of light quartz on the side of the mountains presides over San Bernardino and the rest of the San Bernardino Valley. The city of Lake Arrowhead, California and the adjacent lake, Lake Arrowhead Reservoir, take their names from the formation as does Arrowhead Water.  The Native Americans of the San Bernardino Valley thought the Arrowhead pointed to the artesian hot springs below, which are the site of the historic Arrowhead Springs Hotel, Spa, & Bungalows. The region is also home to the Arrowhead Country Club and Golf Course.

Arrowhead Springs Hotel and Spa

The historic Arrowhead Springs Hotel and Spa, located in the Arrowhead Springs neighborhood, encompasses  directly beneath the Arrowhead geological monument that presides over the San Bernardino Valley. The present building was designed by architects Gordon B. Kaufmann and Paul R. Williams.  The resort contains hot springs, in addition to mineral baths and steam caves located deep underground. It featured a Pacific Electric "Red Car" rail line connecting the hotel to San Bernardino and the Greater Los Angeles area. Long the headquarters for Campus Crusade for Christ, the site remained largely vacant and unused since their operations moved to Florida. In May 2016, the San Manuel Band of Mission Indians purchased the Arrowhead Springs property.

In 1924, architect Arthur B. Benton, designed a rustic concrete entrance archway encased in ornamental boulders. The archway stood 15 feet high with a 26-foot span.

Future
The specific plan for the future of the site includes: a new 115-room annex to the existing 135-room hotel; a new 300-room lakefront hotel; new reservoirs and a reconfiguration of the  Lake Vonette; new vineyards, along with the Windy Point restaurant and wine-tasting site; a new 18-hole golf course; 36 new custom estates on fairway-adjacent lots;  of commercial space, 34 apartment suites built to condominium standards, and 266 condominiums, townhomes, and single-family attached homes in the new Village Walk mixed-use lifestyle center; 300 new condominiums, townhomes, and/or senior apartments in an upscale retirement village; a new  spa resort; 429 condominiums, townhomes, and single-family detached homes located adjacent to the golf course; commercial stables at a new polo club and equestrian center; extensive multi-purpose trails and watercourses; a  public botanical garden;  of private parks; a new  office complex; a new  conference center; and,  of commercial space and 285 condominiums, townhomes, and single-family attached homes in the Hilltown development. Existing facilities on the grounds include: a cinema; ten private bungalows previously owned by such people as Eleanor Roosevelt, Lucille Ball, the Marx Brothers, Judy Garland, Elizabeth Taylor, and Humphrey Bogart; an outdoor amphitheater; a wedding chapel; the Esther Williams Pool and Cabanas; the Hill Auditorium; several ballrooms; a guard house; tennis courts; and the Hacienda.

See also
 List of California Historical Landmarks
California Historical Landmarks in San Bernardino County

References

External links
 

Neighborhoods in San Bernardino, California
San Bernardino Mountains
Buildings and structures in San Bernardino, California
Hotels in California
Autograph Collection Hotels
Paul Williams (architect)
California Historical Landmarks
Geography of San Bernardino, California